Bathia Howie Stuart (1893–1987) was a notable New Zealand actor, singer, journalist, lecturer, film-maker and tourism promoter. She was born in Hastings, Hawke's Bay, New Zealand in 1893. She starred in the silent movie The Adventures of Algy alongside Claude Dampier.

References

1893 births
1987 deaths
New Zealand actresses
New Zealand film producers
People from Hastings, New Zealand